Delbert Eugene "Del" Webb (May 17, 1899 – July 4, 1974) was an American real estate developer, and a co-owner of the New York Yankees baseball club. He is known for founding and developing the retirement community of Sun City, Arizona, and for many works of his firm, Del E. Webb Construction Company.

Early years
Webb was born in Fresno, California, to Ernest G. Webb, a fruit farmer, and Henrietta S. Webb. He dropped out of high school to become a carpenter's apprentice, and in 1919, he married Hazel Lenora Church, a graduate nurse. In 1920, Webb was a ship fitter, and they were living with his parents and two younger brothers in Placer County, California. At the age of 28, he suffered typhoid fever, and as a result moved to Phoenix, Arizona, to recover.

Career
In 1928, Webb began Del E. Webb Construction Company. He received many military contracts during World War II, including the construction of the Poston War Relocation Center near Parker. Poston interned over 17,000 Japanese-Americans and at the time was the third largest "city" in Arizona.

A former semi-professional baseball player and a lifelong fan, Webb and partners Dan Topping and Larry MacPhail purchased the New York Yankees in 1945 for $2.8 million from the estate of Col. Jake Ruppert Jr. After buying out MacPhail in October 1947, Webb and Topping remained owners of the Yankees until selling the club to CBS in 1964 for $11.2 million. During those 20 seasons, the Yankees were in 15 World Series, winning 10.

In 1946 and 1947, mob boss Benjamin "Bugsy" Siegel hired Webb as the general contractor for the Flamingo Hotel and Casino in Las Vegas. After boasting about his claim that he had personally killed 16 men, Siegel said to Webb, "Del, don't worry, we only kill each other", after seeing the panicked look on Webb’s face.

In 1948, Webb was contracted to build 600 houses and a shopping center called Pueblo Gardens in Tucson, Arizona. San Manuel, Arizona, a mining company town and currently a resort town, followed. Established in 1953, the town was built by Webb (along with M.O.W. Homes Inc.) for The Magma Copper Company. It required the building of streets, shopping centers, schools, a hospital and parks. This was a prelude to Sun City, Arizona, which was launched January 1, 1960, with five home models, a shopping center, recreation center and golf course. The opening weekend drew 100,000 people, ten times more than expected, and resulted in a Time magazine cover story.

Personal life
In 1919, Webb married his childhood sweetheart, Hazel Lenora Church. They divorced in 1952. In 1961, Webb married Toni Ince, then aged 41, a buyer for Bullocks Wilshire department store in Los Angeles. Webb was elected to the Gaming Hall of Fame in 2000.

Death
Webb died at age 75 in Rochester, Minnesota on July 4, 1974 following surgery for lung cancer

References

External links
Del Webb company website history of company and man
Del E. Webb Center for the Performing Arts

1899 births
1974 deaths
American casino industry businesspeople
American construction businesspeople
American real estate businesspeople
Major League Baseball owners
New York Yankees owners
People from Fresno, California
Businesspeople from Phoenix, Arizona
20th-century American businesspeople
Arizona culture